Bute Town ( "New Town") is a village in the county borough of Caerphilly, near Rhymney, in Wales.

History 
Throughout the 18th century, portions of land entered the estate of the Scottish Bute Estate, of which the area around Bute Town was one, and so the village was named after the Marquis of Bute. The area was developed into a "model village" to house local ironworkers in the 1830s and consisted of three rows of 16 houses each, for a total of 48 residences. The village's population fluctuated, and in the 19th century between 195 and 430 people lived there.

The village reached a peak in population in 1871, when the Rhymney Valley transitioned from iron production to coal mining and when a growth in railroads in the area brought a spike in workers to the town.

Bute Town has been a Conservation Area since October 1972, and all of the buildings are on the statutory list of buildings of architectural or historic interest.

The Doctor Who episode "The Crimson Horror" filmed on location in Bute Town in July 2012, starring Matt Smith at the Eleventh Doctor, Jenna Coleman as companion Clara Oswald and also the late Dame Diana Rigg and her daughter Rachael Stirling, in their first and only time acting together.

References

Villages in Caerphilly County Borough
1830s establishments in Wales